Karmiraghbyur may refer to:
Nerkin Karmiraghbyur, Armenia
Verin Karmiraghbyur, Armenia